Meghe Dhaka Tara is a 2016 drama directed by Bratya Basu and produced and staged by Naihati Bratyajan. The plot of the drama is based on Ritwik Ghatak's 1960 film Meghe Dhaka Tara.

Credits

Cast 
 Poulomi Basu as Neeta
 Subhashish Mukhopadhyay as Tarini Master
 Partha Bhowmick as Shankar
 Suranjana Dasgupta as Kathakali
 Anirban Ghosh as Sanatan

Crew 
 Bratya Basu - director
 Ujjawal Chattopadhyay - writer

Production 
The rehearsal of the drama started in 2016. In August 2015, Bratya Basu informed about this drama in a press conference. He also informed that at that time he was working on two other dramas.

Casting 
Poulomi Basu played Neeta's role. In Ghatak's film the character was portrayed by Supriya Devi. Subhashish Mukhopadhyay played Tarini Master, Neeta's father role. In Ghatak's movie Bijon Bhattacharya played this character. Partha Bhowmick portrayed Shankar's character, which was played by Anil Chatterjee in the movie. Suranjana Dasgupta and Anirban Ghosh played the roles of Kathakali and Sanatan.

Release 
The drama was first staged on 2 January 2016 at University Institute Hall, Kolkata. As of 3 January 2016, the drama will be staged every Saturday at that auditorium.

References 

2016 plays
Bengali-language plays